"Black Suit" is a song recorded by South Korean boy band Super Junior for their album Play (2017). It was released as the album's title track on November 6, 2017, by SM Entertainment, Label SJ and Genie following the revelation of multiple video teasers. The song was composed by Martin Hoberg Hedegaard and Coach & Sendo, while its lyrics was penned by Lee Seu-ran, Jo Yoon-kyung, Oh Min-joo, Lim Jeong-hyo and ESBEE. The song told the story of a man who steal people's heart while wearing a black suit, inspired by the character Lupin.

A commercial success, the song peaked at number 23 on Gaon Digital Chart and was downloaded over 92,000 times in the month of its release in South Korea. An accompanying music video depicting a heist conducted by the band members during an auction of a black suit, directed by Rigend Film, premiered the same day as the song's release. The visual won the Myx Music Awards 2018 in International Music Video of The Year category. A staple in Super Junior's live concert, they had performed the song many times including at three of their headlining concert tours; Super Show 7, Super Show 8: Infinite Time and Super Show 9: Road.

Background and release
In July 2015, Super Junior released the compilation album Devil to commemorate their ten years debut anniversary. A repackaged edition of the album, retitled as Magic, was released in September 2015. They underwent hiatus shortly afterwards due to most of the band members were undergoing their mandatory military enlistment. In January 2017, Star News reported that Super Junior are going to make a comeback later that year. In September 2017, Sports Dong-a reported that Super Junior would release a new album on their 12th debut anniversary on November 6, 2017, two years since the release of Devil. However, Label SJ denied the rumour, saying that although the band was preparing for an album, its release date has not been decided. At midnight of September 27, a photo containing the cryptic word "D-40" and "SJ Returns" was posted on Super Junior's social media accounts. The band's website also began a countdown to November 6, 2017, the date of their 12th anniversary. 

On October 9, 2017, SJ Returns, a reality program that documented the band's 120 days of preparatory period leading up to the release of their upcoming album started airing on Naver TV and V Live. "Black Suit" was first introduced in episodes 17 and 18 of SJ Returns which aired on October 19, 2017, as one of the five songs shortlisted by their agency's A&R team as the lead single candidate of the upcoming album after conducting blind test involving over 100 demo tapes. An anonymous voting held among themselves resulted in the song being picked as the album's lead single. Super Junior released several video teasers for the track starting November 1, 2017. "Black Suit" and its music video was premiered in front of journalists, before it was released on the evening of November 6, 2017. The single featured the voice of seven out of eleven members of Super Junior, namely Leeteuk, Heechul, Yesung, Shindong, Eunhyuk, Siwon, and Donghae.

Composition and lyrics
"Black Suit" is a dance-pop song written with  emphasise on synth and brass instruments. It is composed by the youngest winner of Danish version of X-Factor, Martin Hedegaard, and Coach & Sendo. It is composed in the key of F minor, with the tempo of 122 beats per minute. Its composition was described as a restrained melody played on top of a swing brass rhythm. Characterised by its cheerful melody and addictive chorus, the song reflected the K-pop trend during the moment of its release. 

"Black Suit" lyrics told the story of a man in a black suit who stole hearts in the fleeting moment in the dark, inspired by the character Lupin. It was penned by Lee Seu-ran, Jo Yoon-kyung, Oh Min-joo, Lim Jeong-hyo and ESBEE. The band explained that the song portrayed the group's existing bright image but with addition of their maturity. Heechul described it as a dance song, while Yesung introduced it as a song that excites people.

Choreography
The song's dance routine was choreographed by Tobias Ellehammer. Band member Eunhyuk said that "simple and easy movements have became Super Junior's signature performance", thus the song's choreography focused on movements that can be easily copied. The song's choreography was first performed by Super Junior on episode 100 of Knowing Bros, which aired on November 4, 2017, ahead of the song's official release. Heechul originally was not planning to join the band's line-up for "Black Suit" performance due to the worsening condition of his leg injury originated from a car accident in 2006 but decided to fill in the gap left by the band members who are serving in the army. The song was specially choreographed to take into account of his condition so that he would only appear at the latter part of the song. They are supported by backup dancers in their performances due to the band being reduced to half its size.

Critical reception
Tamar Herman from Billboard described the song as "both dynamic and playful". She further said the song's release "proves that the aging group can still pull off a powerful K-pop dance track". The Korea Herald writer, Hong Dam-young, on her review said  Junior's] powerful vocals blend well into the song's pulsating swing vibe". She commented on the similarity between the song and their previous single "Devil" (2015), concluding that the band "does not dare experiment with a new genre". She also opined that the song "may be a one-time hit that will not likely stand the test of time". Shin Mi-kyung, writing for Osen, said the song is "full of freewheeling energy", and despite its similarity to the band's previous releases, she found the "tension of the song [to be] attractive". Hwang Hye-jin from Newsen praised the song's arrangement, saying that it "starts with a simple sensation and gradually becomes powerful". Shin Mi-rae from MBN also commented on the song's composition, saying that "the melody of the chorus captivates the ears with its addictiveness that makes it imprinted on you the moment you hear it." News publication Ten Asia described the song as a result of the band "pursuing a more sophisticated style" yet still "showing some of their music colours".

Commercial performance 
"Black Suit" debuted and peaked at number 23 on the Gaon Digital Chart for the week of November 5–11, 2017, following its release. It stayed for three weeks on the chart, positioning at numbers 60 and 85 on the following weeks. The song also reached number 27 on the monthly Gaon Digital Chart, in the chart published for the month of November 2017. It reached number 51 on the monthly Gaon Download Chart, in the chart published for the month of November 2017. It was downloaded over 92,000 times during the month.

In Japan, the song entered the  Billboard Japan Hot 100 at number 81 on the chart issue dated November 15, 2017. It was their only Korean-language song to enter the chart. The song debuted and peaked at number 8 on the World Digital Song Sales chart for the week of November 25, 2017. It stayed for three weeks on the chart, positioning at number 9 and 18 the following weeks.

Music video
The music video of Black Suit, directed by Rigend Film is released on November 6, 2017, the same day as the single's release. It featured the band members plotting a heist to steal an expensive black suit in an auction, however the suit was stolen due to unforeseen circumstances. The band members play various roles in the music video; Leeteuk as the auction host, Heechul as an investor, Yesung as a courier, Shindong as a rich man, Eunhyuk as an appraiser, Siwon as a client agent, and Donghae as a bodyguard. Siwon's part in the music video was retained despite his non-participation in the album promotion. The music video was filmed over a few days in September at a set located at Namyangju, Gyeonggi-do. The visual won the International Music Video of the Year award in Myx Music Awards 2018, making Super Junior the only Korean artist to win an award in the ceremony that year.

Promotion and live performance
During promotion of Play in 2017, Super Junior performed "Black Suit" on music programs including M! Countdown on November 9, on Music Bank on November 10 and November 17, and on Inkigayo on November 12 and November 19, 2017. The live performances only featured six out of seven available band members as Siwon decided to step back from participating in the album's promotional activity. In an episode that aired on January 31, 2020, the band appeared on I Can See Your Voice season 7 as a musical guest. They sang "Black Suit" with the episode's winner. They performed the song on Indonesian television network's, Transmedia 20th anniversary celebration in December 2021.

They also performed the song on year-end awards ceremonies; the 2017 Mnet Asian Music Awards, the 27th Seoul Music Awards, the 2019 KKBox Music Awards, the 2020 Asia Artist Awards, and at the 2021 The Fact Music Awards. They performed the song on their world tour Super Show 7 and its encore Super Show 7S, where they performed while wearing flashy suits.  The opening night of Super Show 7 on December 15, 2017, marked Siwon's first performance of the song with Super Junior. Super Junior also performed the song on their subsequent headlining tours Super Show 8: Infinite Time (2019–2020), and Super Show 9: Road (2022–2023). The song was performed for the first time with Ryeowook in the band's line-up in October 2018, during their showcase for One More Time, while Kyuhyun first performed the song with the band in SM Town Live 2019 in Tokyo in August 2019, both after they were discharged from their military service.

They also performed the song on music festivals such as the K-Wave 2 Music Festival in January 2018, the KCON 2018 New York, at the 2019 K-World Festa, and at KAMP LA 2022. They performed the song on online concert Beyond the Super Show in 2020, at the Super Junior Japan Special Event 2022: Return of the King, and at the affiliated concert tours SM Town Live 2022: SMCU Express, and SM Town Live 2023: SMCU Palace at Kwangya.

Credits and personnel 
Credits are adapted from the liner notes of Replay:

Studio
 Doobdoob Studiorecording
 The Vibe Studiorecording
 S.M. Concert Hall Studiomixing
 Sterling Soundmastering

Personnel

Label SJexecutive producer
SM Entertainmentexecutive supervisor
Tak Young-junproducer
Super Juniorproducer, vocals
Yoo Young-jinmusic and sound supervisor
Lee Seu-ranlyrics
Jo Yoon-kyunglyrics
Oh Min-joolyrics
Lim Jeong-hyolyrics
ESBEElyrics
Martin Hoberg Hedegaardcomposition, arrangement
Coach & Sendocomposition, arrangement
Butterflyvocal director
Joo Chan-yangbackground vocals
Hwang Seong-jaebackground vocals, digital editing
Kim Dong-hatrumpet, brass arrangement, brass conductor
Jang Hyo-seoktenor saxophone
Lee Dae-nambaritone saxophone
Lee Han-jintrombone
Kim Hyun-gonrecording
Ahn Chang-gyurecording 
Kwak Jeong-shinrecording
Jeong Mo-yeonrecording
Seo Mi-raedigital editing
Nam Koong-jinmixing
Chris Gehringermastering

Charts

Japanese version 

The Japanese version of the song was released as the B-side track to "On and On" on December 6, 2017, a month after its Korean release. The single was released as fan exclusive, and was only sold on the Japanese fanclub official shop. The song was added as a track on the band's Japanese compilation album, Star which was released in January 2021.

Release history

References

2017 singles
2017 songs
Korean-language songs
Japanese-language songs
Super Junior songs
SM Entertainment singles